The following is a timeline of the COVID-19 pandemic in Malaysia during 2020.

Timeline

January 
Eight Chinese nationals were quarantined at a hotel in Johor Bahru on 24 January after coming into contact with an infected person in neighbouring Singapore. Despite early reports of them testing negative for the virus, three of them were confirmed to be infected on 25 January and subsequently quarantined at the Sungai Buloh Hospital in Selangor. The Malaysian health ministry published guidelines on the virus and established designated hospitals in each of Malaysia's states to manage any positive cases. The Malaysian public were reminded by local authorities to take precautionary measures in the wake of the virus threat with those travelling to China have been advised to stay away from animal farms and markets in the country and to not eat raw or semi-cooked meats. Following several earlier suspected cases in Sabah's capital of Kota Kinabalu, all direct flights between the state with China were stopped indefinitely.

On 24 January, a two-year-old child who was suspected to have been infected was detained along with their parents. The parents refused quarantine and were detained the next day by police at Senai International Airport before returning to China. The patient including others who refused quarantine were subsequently placed under close monitoring by the local Health Ministry. On 26 January, a fourth case of the virus, unconnected to previous cases, was detected. A suspected case was also detected in the state of Kedah's island of Langkawi involving two female Chinese nationals with both victims quarantined at the Sultanah Maliha Hospital; one later confirmed positive on 29 January. With the increasing number of cases reported in neighbouring Thailand, both the state of Kedah and Penang tightened their borders by conducting stringent checks at its international entry points. A Chinese female national in Bintulu of Sarawak also suspected of having contracted the virus led to the state tightening its border and postponing direct flights to Hainan, despite a recently signed memorandum of understanding (MoU) establishing direct flights with Sarawak.

Of the total of 25 Chinese nationals in Sabah earlier suspected of having contracted the virus, most of them tested negative as of 28 January although one of them later tested positive for the virus upon reaching China. Another eight suspected cases were recorded in Sarawak on 29 January; five in Kuching and one each in Sibu, Bintulu and Miri. Of the total eight suspected cases in the state, six have tested negative. Within the same day, three additional positive cases were confirmed in West Malaysia, involving a four-year-old child quarantined at the Sultanah Maliha Hospital in Kedah, a 52-year-old man at Sultanah Aminah Hospital in Johor and a woman at Sungai Buloh Hospital in Selangor. An eighth case was reported at the Permai Hospital in Johor on the next day.

February 

On 4 February, Malaysia reported two new cases, including a 41-year-old local male, which was the first case involving a Malaysian. The case patient had a recent trip to Singapore and is quarantined in Sungai Buloh Hospital. The other case involved a 63-year-old male from China. That same day, a Chinese girl recovered from COVID-19 and was discharged from hospital.

On 5 February, two Malaysian evacuees from Wuhan tested positive for COVID-19, bringing the total number of cases in the country to 12.

On 6 February, Malaysia reported its first local transmission, the younger sister of the 41-year-old Malaysian who tested positive for COVID-19 on 4 February. She was warded at Sultanah Bahiyah Hospital in Alor Setar. A positive case involving a 37-year-old woman from Wuhan, who had arrived in Malaysia on 25 January, was reported on the same day.

On 7 February, one new case was reported, bringing the total number to 15.

On 8 February, 11 new patients were admitted to Sibu Hospital, Miri Hospital and the Sarawak General Hospital in Kuching. The following day, the Sarawak Health Department established a hotline in response to the virus outbreak. That same day, the total number of cases reached 16. In addition, the total number of recoveries reached two.

On 9 February, one new case was reported, bringing the total number of cases to 17. One recovery was reported, bringing the total number of recoveries to three.

On 10 February, the Sarawak Disaster Management Committee prohibited entry by Singaporeans due to a major increase of positive cases in the neighbouring country. That same day, the total number of cases rose to 18. The latest case was a Malaysian citizen who had recently traveled to China.

On 13 February, one new case was reported, bringing the total number to 13. The new case was a 39-year old woman from China.

On 15 February, three new cases were reported, bringing the total number to 22. Four new recoveries were reported, bringing the total number of recoveries to seven. That same day, an elderly American woman, who was among hundreds of passengers who disembarked from the  cruise ship in Cambodia and flew to Kuala Lumpur in Malaysia, was identified as Malaysia's 22nd confirmed case. Meanwhile, the remaining 143 passengers, including a further six passengers from the same flight with the woman, had been declared free from the virus and were allowed to return into their respective countries.

On 16 February, one recovery was reported, bringing the total number of recoveries to eight. That same day, the Holland America Line and Cambodian health ministry requested that Malaysian health authorities re-test the US citizen to ensure the accuracy of its findings. The American woman tested positive for COVID-19 during the second test. Following this second test confirmation, the Malaysian authorities announced that the remaining passengers of the  would not be allowed to enter the country despite several flights being chartered by Holland America Line with Malaysia Airlines. The cruise liner's passengers had not been able to depart from Cambodia since the country did not have any direct flights to Europe and the United States. During a third check-up, the American woman tested negative for COVID-19. In response, the Cambodian government questioned the accuracy of the Malaysian authorities' testing of the American woman, while claiming there were no diplomatic tensions between Cambodia and Malaysia over the testing of the American woman. On 22 February, the Malaysian Health Ministry issued a statement that the America female patient was recovering after 72 hours of treatment.

On 17 February, one new recovery was reported, bringing the total number of recoveries to nine. The individual was the first Malaysia who had tested positive for COVID-19.

On 20 February, two new recoveries were reported, bringing the total number of COVID-19 patients in hospital down to five.

On 26 February, 20 of Malaysia's 22 positive cases had recovered. Two remained in hospital. That same day, a female Malaysian hospital worker in Sabah's Kudat District suspected of having contracted the virus was quarantined when she developed symptoms after returning from South Korea. Although she was later declared free from the virus, the Malaysian government imposed a ban on travelers from South Korea in response to the rise in positive cases within that country.

On 27 February, one new case was reported, bringing the total number to 23. Two new recoveries were reported, bringing the total number of recoveries to 22.

On 28 February, two new cases were reported, bringing the total number to 25.

March 

In March 2020, several countries in Southeast Asia recorded a significant increase in the number of COVID-19 cases as a result of a Tablighi Jamaat religious gathering held at "Masjid Jamek Sri Petaling", Sri Petaling, Kuala Lumpur, which was suspected to have infected many participants with the virus. The event, which was held from February 27 to March 1, 2020, was attended by about 12,500 participants, including about 1,500 participants from outside Malaysia. Following the surge of COVID-19 infection cases in Malaysia stemming from the Kuala Lumpur religious gathering, the Ministry of Health announced that Malaysia was in the late containment stage and that a special meeting would be held to discuss the next course of action.

On 16 March, Prime Minister Muhyiddin Yassin announced that the federal government would be imposing a nationwide lockdown known as the Movement Control Order (MCO), which would come into effect on 18 March and last for two weeks.

On 17 March, Malaysia reported its first two deaths from the coronavirus, a 60-year-old priest from Emmanuel Baptist Church in Kuching, Sarawak and a 34-year-old participant of the Muslim religious gathering in Sri Petaling from Johor Bahru, Johor.

On 18 March, the Attorney-General's Chambers (AGC) also published a federal gazette that restricted individuals from interstate travelling to other states to curb the spread of COVID-19 within the country.

On 19 March, Health Director-General Noor Hisham once again urged people to stay home, saying that Malaysia has a small chance of blocking the rapid spread of coronavirus disease as compared to the current situation facing by Italy; stating that if it misses the third wave of infection, the situation will be out of control similar to what happened in Italy. He also indicated that the Government would extend the "movement restriction order" for another 14 days. The Prime Minister also appealed to all Malaysians to adhere to the movement control in order to prevent further infections within the country.

On 20 March, it was reported that 15 medical personnel had contracted COVID-19, with one being placed in an intensive care unit (ICU). On 21 March, it was reported that a total of six Malaysian police officers had been infected by the virus while serving their duty.

On 25 March, a total of 72 Malaysia's health workers have been infected by the virus. On the same day, the government extended the movement control order until 14 April. On 26 March, the Malaysian royal household confirmed that seven officers from the nation's National Palace had been confirmed positive, which caused Malaysia's head of state, Abdullah of Pahang and his spouse to be put into quarantine, although they themselves had undergone COVID-19 tests with negative results.

April 

On April 2 and 3, there was a drastic increase in daily cases in the country to above 200 cases a day. Thus, on 3 April, Director-General Noor Hisham stated the sudden spike in new cases were not the 'third wave', but largely due to active case detections on areas affected by Enhanced Movement Controlled Order, a stricter version of the MCO. On 5 April, the Director-General notified that a new cluster had been identified, which involved a person with a travel history to Italy, and now had grown as far as the third generation, with 37 positive cases and five fatalities as of the day. On 6 April two more clusters had been identified: a church gathering at Kuching which resulted in 83 cases and two fatalities and a wedding at Bandar Baru Bangi which led to 88 cases. Both clusters infected people across five generations. On 8 April, the number of cases breached the 4,000 mark with a new subcluster identified in Rembau which was linked to the religious event in Kuala Lumpur and infected 27 people across three generations. 

On 10 April, the government extended the movement control order until 28 April.

By 11 April, a total of 224 healthcare workers had become infected which through investigation were found to be caused by patients with SARI symptoms, patients whose conditions were unknown before getting treatment and from on the ground screening and other activities. The death on 13 April was of a 62-year-old man who had attended the Kuala Lumpur tabligh jamaat gathering. On 14 April, the Director-General mentioned a detection of a new cluster in Sendayan, Negeri Sembilan involving a madrasa with at least 39 cases, and 28 virus clusters were detected nationwide so far.

15 April was the first date that Malaysia recorded fewer than 100 new cases since 14 March. On 18 April a new cluster had been identified among healthcare workers in three government hospitals in Sabah with 31 cases. On 19 April new cluster had been identified which consisted of 43 students returning from Temboro, Magetan, Indonesia. On 22 April a new cluster had been identified in Pengerang with 15 cases. 72 of the cases reported on 29 April came from the Magetan cluster.

At the end of April 2020, daily cases in the country had shown a decline when registering double-digit daily cases. The Director General of Health noted that the decline in cases of this infection was a result of government action implementing the Movement Control Order (MCO) nationwide.

May 

On 4 May, a cluster was identified at a housing area in Kuching. This was linked to the Tablighi Jamaat event in Kuala Lumpur and infected 37 people across three generations. On 7 May, a cluster was identified among security guards at a shopping mall in Cheras with nine Nepalese and a Malaysian infected. On 8 May, a cluster was identified at a factory in Pedas consisting of 60 cases. On 9 May, a cluster was identified in Setia Alam with 12 Bangladeshis testing positive. On 21 May, a cluster was detected at the Bukit Jalil Immigration Depot after 35 foreigners (17 Myanmar nationals, 15 Indian nationals, one Sri Lankan, one Bangladeshi, and one Egyptian) tested positive.

On 22 May, Prime Minister Muhyiddin Yassin also entered into quarantine for 14 days after an officer who attended the post-Cabinet meeting at the Prime Minister's Office on 21 May tested positive. On 23 May, the Director-General confirmed that a new cluster had been identified at Immigration Detention Depot in Semenyih, Selangor. 1,631 detainees and 121 staff had been tested; of whom 21 tested positive. On 25 May, Immigration Director-General Datuk Khairul Dzaimee Daud confirmed that 207 of the 13,929 illegal immigrants detained at three immigration detention centres in peninsular Malaysia had tested positive. 110 of the infected were sent to the COVID-19 quarantine and treatment centre at the Malaysia Agro Exposition Park Serdang (MAEPS). The Director-General also confirmed that a cluster of 44 cases was detected at a construction site in Kuala Lumpur. On 26 May, a surge of 173 cases was reported among foreigners detained at the Bukit Jalil immigration detention centre as well as 13 from the Cheras security guard cluster.

On 29 May, a surge in cases occurred due to the discovery of two clusters consisting of 53 cases in Pedas and 24 Bangladeshi workers who were linked to a cleaning company.

June

On 3 June, a surge of cases was reported among foreigners, 55 of them were from the Bukit Jalil detention centre and 36 were from the Pedas cluster.

On 6 June, the Director-General encouraged people to wear face masks in response to a new directive from the World Health Organization, which found that face masks helped to reduce infections.

On 15 June, there were 32 community transmissions involving foreigners including 14 from the Akademi Imigresen Malaysia in Port Dickson, 15 from the Pedas cluster in Negri Sembilan, and two from the cleaning services company cluster.

As of 18 June, 13,149 individuals have been tested, with 782 testing positive, 11,564 negative, and 803 awaiting results. Out of the 782 positive cases, seven are Malaysians and 775 are foreigners.

On 19 June, the Director-General confirmed that a new cluster consisting of six cases had been detected in Kidurong, Sarawak. The index case was a university student who had tested positive for COVID-19 on 12 June. Contact tracing identified 231 people who had been contact with the patient, 163 of whom had tested negative for the virus.

On 20 June, the Director-General confirmed the discovery of a new cluster in Labu Lanjut, Sepang.

On 23 June, the Director-General announced the closure of the Kuching Church Conference cluster, which had caused three deaths and 191 infections since it was first discovered on 15 March 2020.

On 24 June, three new clusters were identified at a Hulu Langat condominium, a Bukit Bintang cluster, and a Kuching construction site.

On 27 June, the Director-General confirmed that 61,576 Malaysians have returned from overseas with 610 testing positive for COVID-19 as of 25 June. All returnees are subject to a 14 quarantine period.

July

On 17 July, the Director-General confirmed that four new clusters had been identified including a Malaysian who had returned from Nigeria, a foreigner from a professional group that had visited Malaysia, a frontliner who was admitted to the Sarawak General Hospital, and a ship crew member with a history of travel to Japan and Singapore.

On 18 July, the Health Ministry confirmed the discovery of a new cluster in Stutong, Sarawak. The Government has also screened 218 petty traders including 213 Malaysians and five foreigners.

On 24 July, the Director-General also identified three new clusters: the Elsa cluster, PUI Ramnad and PUI Al Khobar.

On 25 July, the Director-General identified two new clusters in Bukit Tiram and at a Kuching construction company.

On 30 July, the Director-General announced the closure of the Bukit Bintang cluster and urged people to follow standard operating procedures (SOPs) during the Hari Raya Aidiladha celebrations held the following day.

August

On 3 August, four sub-district in Kubang Pasu, Kedah was placed under an "Enhanced Movement Control Order" due to the increased number of cases there following two village in Sanglang, Perlis and a Surau in Shah Alam, Selangor five days later.

On 16 August, Malaysian Director-General of Health Noor Hisham Abdullah confirmed that the Malaysian Institute for Medical Research had detected the D614G type mutation after testing three cases from the Sivagangga Cluster and one case from the Ulu Tiram Cluster. This mutation, more infectious than the D614 type, is now the dominant form of the COVID-19 virus in the pandemic.

On 18 August, four of the new locally transmitted cases were connected to clusters in Tawar and Sala in Kedah.

On 20 August, the authorities designated a new cluster at Bintulu port called "Alam", which was linked to an oil tanker.

On 25 August, the Director-General reported that five of the new cases were linked to the Tawar cluster in Kedah, bringing the total in that cluster to 70.

On 30 August, one death was reported, bringing the death toll to 126. The patient was a 75-year-old man with a history of chronic illnesses. This is the first COVID-19 death in Malaysia in August 2020 since the last reported death on 31 July.

September

On 7 September, the Director-General confirmed that 50 of the newly reported community transmissions were linked to the Benteng Lahad Datu police headquarters cluster and Tawau prison in Sabah. The Director-General also announced the new Sungai cluster in the state of Kedah.

On 8 September, the Director-General confirmed that 62 of the cases came from the Benteng Lahad Datu cluster while 23 came from the Sungai cluster in Kedah.

On 10 September, 40 new cases were linked to the Benteng Lahad Datu cluster. On 11 September, 167 new cases were reported in the Benteng Lahad Datu cluster, bringing the total number of cases in that cluster to 337, making it the biggest current cluster in Malaysia.

On 19 September, the Director-General identified a new COVID-19 cluster in Semporna, Sabah. The index case was a Filipino woman (case 10,145), who was the 129th fatal case. A total of 109 people have been screened, with 106 awaiting test results.

On 23 September, a spike of 147 cases was reported, with 134 of these occurring in Sabah. The Director-General also identified a new cluster in Udin, Sabah. On 24 September, 63 of the new cases occurred in Sabah, with 47 being linked to the Bangau-bangau cluster in 
Semporna and the Laut cluster in Kunak.

On 27 September, the Director-General identified three new clusters at Buang Sayang in Sipitang, Sabah; Kg Sakong in Semperna, Sabah; and Setapak in Kuala Lumpur.

On 29 September, the Director-General identified four new clusters: the Jalan Bomba and Jalan Utara clusters in Sabah, the Benteng Pk cluster in Selangor, and the Bakawali cluster in Johor.

October

On 1 October, the Director-General Noor Hisham Abdullah confirmed that 118 of the 260 new cases reported that day had occurred in Sabah while 31 cases reported in other Malaysian states were linked to travel in Sabah. The Health Ministry also identified four new clusters: the Bah Ketil cluster in Kedah, the Joo Hwa cluster in Sabah, and the Selasih cluster in Putrajaya.

On 3 October, the Director-General identified three new clusters: two in Kedah and one in Sabah.

On 5 October, Malaysia recorded 432 new cases, the highest daily increase since the pandemic hit the country. Kedah and Sabah recorded the highest number of new cases that day, 241 and 130 respectively. Zulkifli Mohamad Al-Bakri, the Minister in the Prime Minister's Department in charge of religious affairs, tested positive for COVID-19 that day.

On 7 October, 489 were reported, with 282 coming from Sabah and 153 from Kedah. Most of these cases came from the red zones in Sabah and Kedah's Tembok cluster. On 8 October, the Health Ministry identified five new clusters: the Tujuh Serangkai and Tanamera clusters in Sabah, Jalan Pantai Cluster in Kuala Lumpur, Bah Arnab Cluster in Sarawak, and Bah Bangat Cluster in Labuan.

On 17 October, the Director General Noor Hisham identified five new clusters: Teduh in Sabah's Lahad Datu district, Menara in Selangor, Keladi in Selangor's Klang District, the Sentral cluster in Kuala Lumpur, and the Bah Bemban cluster involving Dungun, Terengganu and Kota Kinabalu in Sabah.

On 23 October, the Director General Noor Hisham identified three new clusters: the Samudera cluster in Sandakan, Sabah; the Palma cluster in Gombak, Hulu Selangor and Kepong, Kuala Lumpur; and the Jaya cluster at Sepang in Selangor, and Seremban in Negri Sembilan.

On 24 October, Malaysian health authorities recorded a record 1,228 cases, the highest number of cases to date. Of this figure, 889 cases were reported in Sabah, the site of the "third wave" of outbreaks.

On 25 October, the Ministry of Health identified nine new clusters: four in Sabah and one each in Selangor, Penang, Sarawak, Johor and Negeri Sembilan.

November

On 1 November, the Director-General identified two new clusters: the Usaha cluster in the Klang Valley and the Tembaga cluster in Penang.

On 6 November, the Director General reported that 1,199 of the 1,755 cases reported that date occurred in Sabah, marking the first time that the state has recorded new four digit figures in a single day and the highest number of new positive cases in the state so far.

On 11 November, the Director-General identified three new clusters in Sabah: the Karamunting cluster, Saga cluster and Haven cluster.

On 15 November, the Klang Valley including Kuala Lumpur reported a spike of 661 cases with the Damanlela Construction Site cluster in Kuala Lumpur recording 460 cases.

On 19 November, the Director General announced that over 9,000 of the country's COVID-19 cases were detected through the MySejahtera contact tracing app launched on 20 April.

On 16 November 2020, several COVID-19 cases were detected in one of the Top Glove dormitories in Klang which has led to an enhanced movement control order being implemented in the surrounding area between 17 November and 30 November. By 27 November 2020, more than 4000 cases were linked to the Top Glove dormitories cluster. On 30 November, the EMCO at Top Glove's dormitories throughout the country was extended until 14 December.

December

On 1 December, a total of 778 cases came from the Teratai cluster in Selangor, which was linked to an outbreak among foreign workers at Top Glove factories in the Klang District, Kuala Selangor, and Kepong.

On 4 December, the total number of cases exceeded the 70,000 mark.

On 10 December, Malaysia reported a new record of 2,234 new cases. The following day, Malaysia reached the 80,000 mark while the death toll reached 402.

On 16 December, Malaysia surpassed China's case numbers. On 18 December, the total number of cases in Malaysia exceeded the 90,000 mark.

On 21 December, Panasonic Malaysia confirmed that 116 employees at its two manufacturing facilities in Shah Alam, Selangor had tested positive for COVID-19.

On 22 December, Noor Hisham reported eight new clusters: the Bukit Naga and Pasadena Babu clusters in Selangor; the Tapak Bina Resident cluster and two other clusters in Kuala Lumpur; the Tampoi Jaya cluster in Johor; the Rapat cluster in Perak; and the Paginatan cluster in Sabah.

By 23 December, the number of recoveries in Malaysia had exceeded 80,000. That same day, the Malaysian Health Ministry confirmed that it had identified a new COVID-19 strain dubbed the “A701B” strain, which is similar to a strain found in South Africa, Australia, and the Netherlands. On December 24, Malaysia exceeded more than 100,000 COVID-19 cases.

On 26 December, a record number of 2,335 new cases were confirmed that day.

On 30 December, Johor recorded the highest number of cases since the COVID-19 outbreak with a total of 607 cases, with 374 of them coming from the Tembok Choh prison cluster.

References

2020
2020 in Malaysia